HMS Rutherford (K558) was a British Captain-class frigate of the Royal Navy in commission during World War II. Originally constructed as a United States Navy Buckley-class destroyer escort, she served in the Royal Navy from 1943 to 1945.

Construction and transfer
The ship was laid down as the unnamed U.S. Navy destroyer escort DE-93 by Bethlehem-Hingham Shipyard, Inc., in Hingham, Massachusetts, on 4 August 1943 and launched on 23 October 1943. She was transferred to the United Kingdom upon completion on 16 December 1943.

Service history

Commissioned into service in the Royal Navy as the frigate HMS Rutherford (K558) on 16 December 1943 simultaneously with her transfer, she underwent acceptance trials in Casco Bay in Maine and, upon finishing them in January 1944, proceeded to Bermuda for shakedown and crew training afloat and ashore. Completing shakedown and training in March 1944, she departed Bermuda bound for Halifax, Nova Scotia, Canada, suffering damage during the voyage when she struck submerged wreckage. She underwent repairs at Halifax and, upon completing them, proceeded to Belfast, Northern Ireland, where on 26 March 1944 she entered a shipyard for modifications to meet Royal Navy requirements.

After her modifications were completed in May 1944, Rutherford was assigned to serve in the 1st Destroyer Flotilla, based at Harwich, England, on convoy escort duty and as a Coastal Forces Control Frigate (CFCF), in the latter role operating with Royal Navy Coastal Forces responsible for controlling and providing radar support to groups of British motor torpedo boats intercepting German motor torpedo boats in the North Sea before the German boats could attack Allied convoys.

The Allied invasion of Normandy began on 6 June 1944. Although not involved in the assault phase of the landings, Rutherford was assigned later in June to escort convoys from the Thames Estuary bringing reinforcements to the beachheads, and she carried out these duties until August 1944.

In September 1944, Rutherford returned to her convoy defence and CFCF duties at Harwich, operating in the Thames Estuary and North Sea through November 1944. In December 1944, she shifted the focus of her activities to waters off the coasts of Belgium and the Netherlands, engaging German motor torpedo boats reported by Allied aircraft and hitting several of them with gunfire. From January to March 1945 she operated on convoy defence and CFCF duties off the Scheldt Estuary.

In April 1945 Rutherford deployed off the Belgian and Dutch coasts with HMS Cubitt to continue her convoy defence and CFCF duties. On 7 April 1945 she took part in an engagement against German S-boat – known to the Allies as "E-boat" – motor torpedo boats in which two S-boats were badly damaged, also rescuing the crews of the British motor torpedo boats  and  after they were fatally damaged by S-boats during a close-range battle. On 9 April 1945 she intercepted a group of S-boats sighted off Ostend, Belgium, by Allied aircraft and sank two of them in a short action.

After the surrender of Germany in early May 1945, Rutherford was selected for conversion to a fighter direction ship for service with the British Pacific Fleet. She proceeded to a commercial shipyard in the United Kingdom that month to undergo a refit for her new role. Her refit was not yet complete when the armistice with Japan of 15 August 1945 brought World War II to a close, and further work on her conversion was suspended.

The Royal Navy soon steamed Rutherford to the United States, where it returned her to the U.S. Navy on 25 October 1945.

Disposal
The U.S. Navy struck Rutherford from its Naval Vessel Register on 19 December 1945. She was sold in May 1946 for scrapping.

References

 

 

Captain-class frigates
Buckley-class destroyer escorts
World War II frigates of the United Kingdom
Ships built in Hingham, Massachusetts
1943 ships